Life or Death may refer to:

Books
Life or Death, novel by the Kazakh author Gabiden Mustafin 1941
Life or Death, novel by the Bulgarian author Dimiter Angelov
Life or Death (novel), a novel by Michael Robotham 2014

Film
 Life or Death (film), a 1955 Egyptian film
 Life or Death (Bulgarian film) (:bg:На живот и смърт) 1974 Bulgarian film based on Angelov's novel

Music
 Life or Death (C-Murder album), 1998
 Life or Death (Lili Añel album), 2008